Pulled may refer

 Pulled rickshaw
 Pulled wool
 Pulled pork
 Pulled hamstring
 Pulled elbow